Shere is a village east of Jos city, the capital of Plateau State in central Nigeria. The village is found on hills called Shere Hills on the northern part of the Jos Plateau. The Hills got the name Shere from the village.

Shere is a village east of Jos city, the capital of Plateau State in central Nigeria. The village is found on hills called Shere Hills on the northern part of the Jos Plateau. The Hills got the name Shere from the village.

The village is found at an elevation of about 1,401 metres (4,596 ft) high[1] on the hills making the village the most highly elevated village in Northern Nigeria.

References

Populated places in Plateau State